is a village located in Niigata Prefecture, Japan. , the village had an estimated population of 5,291 in 1920 households, and a population density of 17.7 persons per km².

Geography

Sekikawa is located in mountainous northeastern Niigata Prefecture, bordered by Yamagata Prefecture to the east.

Surrounding municipalities
Niigata Prefecture
Murakami
Tainai
Yamagata Prefecture
Oguni

Climate
Sekikawa has a Humid climate (Köppen Cfa) characterized by warm, wet summers and cold winters with heavy snowfall.

Demographics
Per Japanese census data, the population of Sekikawa has declined steadily over the past 50 years.

History
The area of present-day Sekikawa was part of ancient Echigo Province. During the Edo period, much of the area was part of the holdings of Yonezawa Domain under the Tokugawa shogunate. The area was organized as part of Iwafune District, Niigata following the Meiji restoration. The modern village of Sekigawa was established on August 1, 1954 by the merger of the villages of Seki, Shichikatani, and Kukatani. On August 1, 1954, Sekikawa merged with the neighboring village of Onnagawa.

Economy
The local economy is dominated by agriculture.

Education
Sekikawa has one public elementary school and one public middle school operated by the village government. The village does not have a high school.

Transportation

Railway
 JR East - Yonesaka Line
 -  -  -

Highway

References

External links

Official Website 

Villages in Niigata Prefecture
Sekikawa, Niigata